Professor Zacchaeus Adangor (SAN), popularly known as Zacchaeus Adangor is the Attorney General of Rivers State. He is Nigerian Politician and the Commissioner for Rivers State Ministry of Justice . He is a renowned Professor of Constitutional Law and Natural Resources with the Faculty of Law,   Rivers State University, Port Harcourt. In 2020, he was sworn in as a Senior Advocate of Nigeria (SAN).  Also, he is a member of the Chartered Institute of Arbitrators (UK) and a Knight of Saint Christopher (Ksc). Prof. Zacchaeus Adangor has contributed significantly to the development of Constitutional law in Nigeria. His eruditions have been published widely in both local and international law journals with several book chapters and monographs

Early life

Seleted publications

Political career

Personal life

See also 

 List of people from Rivers State
 Judiciary of Rivers State
 Attorney General of Rivers State

References 

Nigerian government officials
Attorneys General of Rivers State
Year of birth missing (living people)
Living people